Oak Ridges was a federal and provincial electoral district in Ontario, Canada, that was represented in the House of Commons of Canada from 1997 to 2003 and in the Legislative Assembly of Ontario from 1999 to 2007. This riding was created in 1996, from parts of Markham—Whitchurch—Stouffville and York North ridings.

It consisted of the towns of Richmond Hill and Whitchurch-Stouffville, and the part of the town of Markham (now a city) north of 16th Avenue.

The electoral district was abolished in 2003 when it was redistributed between Oak Ridges—Markham and Richmond Hill  ridings.

Members of Parliament

This riding has elected the following Members of Parliament:

Federal election results

|-

|Liberal
|Bryon Wilfert
|align="right"|33,058

|Progressive Conservative
|John Oostrom
|align="right"|8,409

|New Democratic
|Joseph Thevarkunnel
|align="right"| 1,623

|Natural Law
|Mary Wan
|align="right"|172
|}

Provincial election results

See also

 List of Canadian federal electoral districts
 Past Canadian electoral districts

References

External links
 Website of the Parliament of Canada
 Elections Ontario  1999 results and 2003 results

Former federal electoral districts of Ontario
Former provincial electoral districts of Ontario